Magic System is an Ivorian coupé-décalé band from Abidjan. It was founded in 1996 and comprises Asalfo, Goude, Tino, and Manadja.

Magic System's recordings in the Zouglou dance style have featured in the charts throughout Africa,  and in France, where the band became very popular modern African artists.

Discography

Studio albums

Singles 

*Did not appear in the official Belgian Ultratop 50 charts, but rather in the bubbling under Ultratip charts.

Featured in

*Did not appear in the official Belgian Ultratop 50 charts, but rather in the bubbling under Ultratip charts.

See also
World music

References

External links
Magic System Official Myspace Website
Magic System Official Website
RFI Music.com (French, with audio samples)
Feb 2005 interview (in French)
Songs by Magic System translated into English

Ivorian musical groups
Organizations based in Abidjan
1976 establishments in Ivory Coast
Musical groups established in 1996